Bukoš may refer to:

Bukoš, Vučitrn, a village in Vučitrn Municipality
, a village in Suva Reka Municipality

See also
Bukosh (disambiguation)